Rachel Rutherford (born Rachel Rutherford Englund Knapp) is a former soloist with New York City Ballet.

Rutherford was born in New York City, the daughter of dancer and ballet teacher Gage Bush Englund. She began her training at age eight at the Joffrey Ballet School and entered the School of American Ballet in 1987. While attending the Chapin School, from which she eventually graduated in 1994, Rutherford also received the D.A.N.C.E. scholarship allowing her to study in Spring 1992 at the Royal Danish Ballet. She became an apprentice with the New York City Ballet the following year and joined the corps de ballet late 1995. The next Spring she appeared on the Late Show with David Letterman.

Ms. Rutherford was promoted to soloist  at the New York City Ballet in May 2002, danced that year in Chiaroscuro on the Live from Lincoln Center broadcast, New York City Ballet's Diamond Project: Ten Years of New Choreography, and again two years later dancing in Concerto Barocco on their Lincoln Center Celebrates Balanchine 100, both on PBS. She retired in 2011.

Roles

originated featured roles

Stephen Baynes 
 Twilight Courante

Miriam Mahdaviani 
 Appalachia Waltz
 Urban Dances

Angelin Preljocaj 
 La Stravaganza

Jerome Robbins 
 NY Export: Opus Jazz, NYCB premiere

Christopher Wheeldon 
 Carnival of the Animals
 Carousel (A Dance)
 Slavonic Dances

originated corps roles

Eliot Feld 
 Organon

Robert La Fosse and Robert Garland 
 Tributary

Peter Martins 
 Concerti Armonici
 Reliquary

Jerome Robbins 
 Brandenburg
 West Side Story Suite

featured roles

George Balanchine 
 Apollo
 Ballo della Regina
 Chaconne
 Concerto Barocco
 Divertimento No. 15
 The Firebird
 The Four Temperaments
 The Nutcracker
 [[Jewels (ballet)#Emeralds|'Jewels (Emeralds)]]
 Liebeslieder Walzer A Midsummer Night’s Dream Tschaikovsky Suite No. 3 La Valse Western Symphony Who Cares? August Bournonville 
 Pas de Six Miriam Mahdaviani 
 Correlazione Peter Martins 
 The Sleeping Beauty Stabat Mater Swan Lake Thou Swell Alexei Ratmansky 
 Russian Seasons Jerome Robbins 
 Antique Epigraphs Dances at a Gathering Dybbuk Fancy Free Fanfare The Four Seasons Glass Pieces The Goldberg Variations Interplay In the Night Lynne Taylor-Corbett 
 Chiaroscuro''

References 

New York City Ballet soloists
American ballerinas
Artists from New York City
Year of birth missing (living people)
School of American Ballet alumni
Joffrey Ballet School alumni
Living people